Moutier-Rozeille is a commune in the Creuse department in the Nouvelle-Aquitaine region in central France.

Geography

Population

Sights
 The church, dating from the eleventh century.
 The ruins of a feudal castle at Confolent.
 The ruins of the St Hilaire church. Originally built in the mid-7th century around a Gallo-Roman mausoleum, the church has been continuously occupied until the end of the 19th century. With many graves and architectural features, the site is regularly studied by archaeologists since 2007.

See also
Communes of the Creuse department

References

Communes of Creuse